Ernest Carroll may refer to:

 Ernest Carroll Moore (1871–1955), American educator
 Ernie Carroll (1929–2022), Australian puppeteer and entertainer